This is a list of shopping malls in Malaysia.
(Note: ÆON BiG, Billion, E-mart, Econsave, Giant, Mydin, KIPMall, Sunshine and Lotus's are categorised as hypermarkets and thus not listed in this article.)

Federal Territories

Kuala Lumpur

Ampang
 Great Eastern Mall

Bangsar
 Bangsar Village I & II
Bangsar Shopping Centre

Brickfields
 NU Sentral

Bukit Bintang

 Berjaya Times Square
 Bukit Bintang Plaza (Construction on hold)
 Fahrenheit 88
 Imbi Plaza
 Kenanga Wholesale City
 Lot 10
 Malaysia Grand Bazaar
 Mitsui Shopping Park LaLaport Bukit Bintang City Centre
 Plaza Low Yat
 Pavilion Kuala Lumpur
 Sungei Wang Plaza
The Exchange TRX (opening in 2025)
The Starhill or Starhill Gallery
118 Mall (opening in 2024)

Bukit Jalil 

Aurora Place Mall
Pavilion Bukit Jalil

Cheras

 1 Shamelin Shopping Centre
 ÆON Taman Maluri Shopping Centre
 Sunway Velocity Mall
 Viva Home
 Cheras Leisure Mall
 Cheras Sentral Mall
 EkoCheras Mall
 MyTOWN Shopping Centre

City Centre

8 Conlay (opening soon)
Avenue K Shopping Mall
 Intermark Mall
M Podium KLCC (opening soon)
Shoppes At Four Seasons Place
 Suria KLCC
The Conlay (opening soon)
 The LINC KL
 The Weld

Damansara Heights

 Damansara City Mall (DC Mall)
 Glo Damansara
Pavilion Damansara Heights (opening in Q2 2023)

Dang Wangi

 CapSquare Centre

Chow Kit

 City One Plaza
Pertama Complex
 Quill City Mall
 SOGO Kuala Lumpur
 Sunway Putra Mall

Jalan Ipoh 

 District K @ KL Digital City (coming soon)
Mutiara Complex
Sungai Mas Plaza

Jalan Klang Lama

 Pearl Point Shopping Mall & Pearl Shopping Gallery
The Scott Garden

Kepong

 ÆON Mall Metro Prima
 Brem Mall
 Kepong Village Mall

KL Metropolis 

 KL Metropolis Lifestyle Mall (coming soon)
KL Midtown (coming soon)
 Met Galleria (opening in 2023)

Mid Valley City 

 Mid Valley Megamall
 The Gardens Mall

Pantai Dalam

 KL Eco City Mall
 KL Gateway Mall
Nexus Bangsar South
The Sphere

Pudu

 Pudu Plaza
Pudu Sentral

Salak South

 Plaza Salak Park

Segambut 

 1 Mont Kiara
 163 Retail Park
 D'Immersione Avenue (opening in 2023)
 Hartamas Shopping Centre
 Plaza Mont Kiara
Publika Shopping Gallery
Solaris Parq The Mall (opening in 2025)
United Point

Setapak

 Setapak Central

Setiawangsa

 ÆON AU2 (Setiawangsa) Shopping Centre
Datum Jelatek Mall

Sri Petaling

 Endah Parade

Sungai Besi

 Plaza 63

Taman Melati

 KL East Mall
 M3 Mall

Taman Melawati
 Melawati Mall

Wangsa Maju

 ÆON Mall Wangsa Maju
 Wangsa Walk Mall

Labuan
 Financial Park Labuan
 Labuan Times Square

Putrajaya
 Alamanda Shopping Centre
 IOI City Mall Putrajaya
 Suria Mall Putrajaya

Johor

Batu Pahat 
 Batu Pahat Mall
 Square One Mall
 The Summit Batu Pahat

Iskandar Puteri 
ÆON Mall Bukit Indah
 ÆON Taman Universiti Shopping Centre
 Eco Galleria
 Mall of Medini
 Perling Mall
 Skudai Parade
 Sunway Big Box
 Sutera Mall
 Tasik Central
 U Mall

Johor Bahru 
 ÆON Mall Bandar Dato' Onn
 ÆON Permas Jaya Shopping Centre
 ÆON Mall Tebrau City
 Angsana Johor Bahru Mall
 Beletime Danga Bay
 Danga City Mall (Temporarily closed for renovations)
 Galleria@Kotaraya
 Holiday Plaza
 Johor Bahru City Square
 Komtar JBCC
 KSL City Mall
 Paradigm Mall Johor Bahru
 Paragon Market Place
 Plaza Pelangi
 Plaza Sentosa
 R&F Mall Johor Bahru
 Stellar Walk 
 The Mall, Mid Valley Southkey 
 Today's Mall
 Toppen Shopping Centre

Kluang 
 Kluang Mall
 Kluang Parade

Kota Tinggi 
 Heritage Mall
 Plaza Kota Tinggi

Kulai 
 ÆON Mall Kulaijaya
 IOI Mall Kulai
 Johor Premium Outlets
 Kulai Centre Point

Muar 
 Wetex Parade
 Muar Trade Centre

Pengerang 
 SKS City Mall

Pontian 
 Plaza Pontian

Segamat 
 Segamat Central(formerly One Segamat Mall)
 U Sentral Shopping Centre

Kedah

Alor Setar
 Alor Setar Mall
 Aman Central
 City Plaza
 Star Parade
 Sentosa Plaza

Kubang Pasu
 Jitra Mall

Kulim
 Kulim Landmark Central

Langkawi
 Cenang Mall
 Langkawi Fair Shopping Mall
 Langkawi Parade

Sungai Petani 
 Amanjaya Mall
 Central Square
 Petani Parade
 SP Plaza
 Village Mall

Kelantan

Kota Bharu
 ÆON Mall Kota Bharu
 KB Mall KB MALL
 G-Orange Mall Tunjong
 Kota Seri Mutiara Shopping Centre
 Kota Bharu Trade Centre (KBTC) Kota Bharu

Malacca

Alor Gajah
Freeport A'Famosa Outlet

Malacca City
 ÆON Mall Melaka (Ayer Keroh)
 ÆON Mall Bandaraya Melaka
 Dataran Pahlawan Melaka Megamall
 Elements Mall Malacca
 Hang Tuah Plaza
 Hatten Square
 Imperio mall
 K7 Community Mall
 Mahkota Parade
 Melaka Mall (formerly Kotamas)
 Soon Seng Plaza
 Terminal Pahlawan (Melaka wholesale city) 
 The Shore Shopping Gallery

Negeri Sembilan

Jempol
 Kiara Square, Bahau

Nilai
 ÆON Mall Nilai
 MesaMall Nilai

Port Dickson
 Regina Mall

Seremban
 ÆON Seremban 2 Shopping Centre
 Angsana Seremban Mall, Ampangan
 Centrepoint Seremban Shopping Mall
 Era Square
 KM Plaza
 Palm Mall
 Seremban Gateway
 Seremban Prima

Pahang

Cameron Highlands
 Cameron Centrum, Brinchang
 Cameron Fair Shopping Centre, Tanah Rata
 Cameron Square, Brinchang

Genting Highlands
 Awana SkyCentral
 First World Plaza
 Genting Highlands Premium Outlet
 Pavilion Genting Highlands (opening soon)
 SkyAvenue

Kuantan
 Berjaya Megamall
 East Coast Mall
 Gio Mall
 Kuantan Parade
 Kuantan City Mall
 Teruntum Complex

Temerloh
 Temerloh Mall
 TMG Temerloh

Mentakab
 Mentakab Star Mall

Penang

Penang Island
 1st Avenue Mall
 All Seasons Place
 Bukit Jambul Complex
 D'Piazza Mall
 GAMA Supermarket & Departmental Store
 GBS@Mayang
 Gurney Paragon
 Gurney Plaza
 ICT @ Komtar Digital Mall
 Island Plaza
 Komtar
 M Mall O2O
 One Precinct
 Penang Plaza
 Penang Times Square
 Prangin Mall
 Queensbay Mall
 Southbay Plaza
Sunway Valleycity Mall (opening soon)
 Straits Quay
 Udini Square

Seberang Perai
 AEON Mall Bukit Mertajam
 Bukit Mertajam Wholesale City
 Design Village
 Megamal Pinang
 Pearl City Mall
 Sunway Carnival Mall

Perak

Ipoh

 ÆON Mall Ipoh Station 18
 ÆON Mall Kinta City
 ÆON Mall Klebang
 ÆON Midtown Falim
 Angsana Ipoh Mall

 IPOH Parade
 Kompleks Yik Foong
 Perak IT Mall
Sunway Ipoh Mall (opening in 2025)

Kampar
 Kampar Terminal Mall
 Tin Village Mall

Kerian
 Kerian Sentral Mall, Parit Buntar

Manjung
 ÆON Mall Seri Manjung

Perak Tengah

 D'Mall, Seri Iskandar

Taiping
 ÆON Mall Taiping
 Taiping Mall
 Taiping Sentral Mall

Sabah

Interior Division
 Keningau Mall

Sandakan Division
 Harbour Mall Sandakan

Tawau Division
 Eastern Plaza

Kota Kinabalu
 1Borneo Hypermall
 88 Mall
 Centre Point Sabah
 City Mall
 EG Mall Inanam
 Grand Merdeka
 Imago KK Times Square
 Inanam Mall
 ITCC Penampang
 Jesselton Residences (Jesselton Duty Free Mall) 
 Karamunsing Complex
 KK Plaza
 Mega Long Mall
 Oceanus Waterfront Mall
 Plaza Shell
 Riverson The Walk
 Suria Sabah
 Sutera Avenue
 Wisma Merdeka

Sarawak

Bintulu
 Bintulu Terminal Bus Station
 Boulevard Shopping Mall Bintulu
 City Point Mall
 Li Hua Plaza
 Medan Mall
 Naim Street Mall
 Parkcity Commerce Square Mall
 Parkcity Mall
 The Spring Bintulu
 Times Square Mega Mall

Kota Samarahan
 Aiman Mall (@iman Mall)
 Summer Mall
 La Promenade Mall

Kuching
 ÆON Mall Kuching Central
 Aeroville Mall
 Boulevard Shopping Mall
 CityOne Megamall
 Crown Square
 Eco Mall
 Electra House
 Farley Mall
 Genesis Parade
 Green Heights Mall
 Hock Lee Centre (Under renovation)
 Hopoh Shopping Centre
 Kuching Sentral
 Majma Mall
 Matang Mall
 MetroMall
 Moyan Square
 OneJaya Lifestyle Mall
 One TJ ICT Shopping Complex
 Papillon Street Mall
 Plaza Merdeka Shopping Center
 Riverside Shopping Complex
 Sarawak Plaza
 ST3 Shopping Mall
 Tabuan Plaza
 The Hills
 The Spring Shopping Mall
 Tun Jugah Mall
 Vivacity Megamall
 Wisma Saberkas
 Wisma Satok
 Wisma Sentosa
 Wisma Wan

Limbang
 Limbang Plaza

Miri
 Bintang Megamall
 Boulevard Shopping Mall Miri
 Imperial Mall
 Miri Plaza
 MYY Mall
 Pelita Tunku
 Permaisuri Imperial City Mall
 Permy Mall
 Soon Hup Tower

Mukah
 Medan Mall

Serian
 Eastern Mall

Sibu 
 Delta Mall
 Hann's Residence 
 Medan Mall
 Sarawak House Shopping Complex
 Star Mega Mall
 The Swan Square
 Wisma Sanyan

Sri Aman 
 Plaza Simanggang

Selangor

Ampang Jaya
 Ampang Point
 Axis Atrium
 Galaxy Ampang
 Pandan Capital Mall
 Spectrum Shopping Mall

Bandar Baru Bangi 

 Bangi Gateway
 De Centrum Mall
 Evo Bangi

Cheras 

 ÆON Cheras Selatan Shopping Centre
 BMC Mall (formerly AEON Makhota Cheras)

Cyberjaya 

 D'Pulze Shopping Centre
 Gem In Mall
 Shaftsbury Square Cyberjaya

Kajang

 Metro Point Kajang
 Plaza Metro Kajang

Klang
 ÆON Mall Bukit Raja
ÆON Mall Bukit Tinggi
 Centro Mall
 Galleri Klang Sentral
 GM Klang Wholesale City
 Harbour Place
 Klang Parade
KSL Esplanade Mall (opening soon)
Sunway Pier Port Klang (Opening Soon)

Petaling Jaya
 1 Utama
 3 Damansara Shopping Mall
Amcorp Mall
Atria Shopping Gallery
CITTA Mall
 Empire City Mall
Evolve Concept Mall
 IPC Shopping Centre
Jaya One
 Jaya Shopping Centre
 Paradigm Mall Petaling Jaya
Sunway Giza
 The Curve
The Starling
Tropicana Gardens Mall

Selayang

 ÆON Rawang Anggun Shopping Centre
 Selayang Mall
 Selayang Capitol Complex
 168 Park Selayang Mall (Opening Soon by Year 2024)

Semenyih 

 Ecohill Walk Mall

Sepang

 Gateway@klia2
Mitsui Outlet Park KLIA Sepang

Seri Kembangan
 ÆON Taman Equine Shopping Centre
 South City Plaza
 The Mines

Shah Alam

 ÆON Mall Shah Alam
 Anggerik Mall
 Central i-City
 IRDKL Mall
 Kompleks PKNS Shah Alam
 Ole-Ole Shopping Centre
 Plaza Shah Alam
 Plaza Alam Sentral
 SACC Mall Shah Alam
 Setia City Mall
 Space U8 Mall
 Star Avenue Lifestyle Mall

Subang Jaya

 Da Men Mall
 Empire Shopping Gallery
 IOI Mall Puchong Jaya
 M Square Puchong
 Main Place Mall
 Pallazo 19 Mall (formerly known as The 19 USJ City Mall)
 One City Mall
 Setia Walk, Puchong
 SS15 Courtyard
 Subang Parade
 Sunway Pyramid
 Sunway South Quay Mall (Opening Soon)
 The Summit USJ

Telok Panglima Garang 

Quayside Mall
Sanctuary Mall

Terengganu

Kemaman
 Kemaman Centre Point
 Mesra Mall, Kemasik

Kuala Terengganu
 KTCC Mall
 Paya Bunga Square/Sentral
Mayang Mall (opening in 2023)

References

Malaysia
Shopping malls